Calgary-Peigan is a provincial electoral district in Alberta, Canada. The district will be one of 87 districts mandated to return a single member (MLA) to the Legislative Assembly of Alberta using the first past the post method of voting. It will be contested for the first time in the 2019 Alberta election.

Geography
The district is located in eastern Calgary, containing the western part of Dover, the neighbourhoods of Ogden, Riverbend, Quarry Park, Douglasdale and Douglasglen, the northern part of McKenzie Lake, and the former hamlet of Shepard. It is bounded on the west by the Bow River and stretches to the eastern edge of Calgary, also including the sprawling industrial subdivisions around the CPR lands and Ralph Klein Park. It is named for Peigan Trail SE, which forms part of its northern boundary.

History

The district was created in 2017 when the Electoral Boundaries Commission recommended abolishing Calgary-Fort and shifting the boundaries of Calgary-Hays southward. Calgary-Peigan was formed from most of Calgary-Fort, the northern neighbourhoods of Calgary-Hays, and a small part of Calgary-Acadia (the neighbourhood of Riverbend). As Fort Calgary was moved to the district of Calgary-Buffalo, the name Calgary-Fort could no longer be used.

Electoral results

References

Alberta provincial electoral districts
Politics of Calgary